Pan Am Flight 217 was a Boeing 707 that crashed near Caracas, Venezuela while on a flight from New York City, USA on December 12, 1968. Though pilot error was to blame, the National Transportation Safety Board concluded the probable cause was undetermined. There were no survivors.

Aircraft and crew 
Pan Am Flight 217 was operated by a Pan American World Airways (Pan Am) Boeing 707-321B (registration N494PA, named Clipper Malay). The aircraft was less than a year old — its first flight was on March 7, 1968, and it was delivered to Pan Am on March 28.

There were nine crew members, including eight from the United States and one from Sweden. The captain was 50 years old and had 24,000 flight hours' experience, including 6,737 hours on the Boeing 707.

Accident description 
The aircraft took off from New York's John F. Kennedy International Airport on a scheduled flight to Caracas Simon Bolivar International Airport on December 12, 1968. As the aircraft was nearing Caracas, it disappeared from air traffic control's radar screens. At 22:05 local time, the aircraft crashed into the Caribbean Sea and exploded. At this point, a call was made to the Venezuelan Navy to search for the aircraft. Wreckage of the Boeing 707 was found  from Caracas. All 51 passengers and crew died in the crash.

Various aircraft and boats, both naval and civilian, were employed in the search and recovery operation. Some reports stated that many bodies were eaten by sharks. The crash was the deadliest aviation disaster to occur in Venezuela up to that point in time, but was surpassed by Viasa Flight 742 in 1969.

Notable passengers 
One of those who perished in the flight 217 crash was Olga Antonetti, a former Miss Venezuela. Also killed was Rafael Antonio Curra, a Venezuelan ichthyologist and university professor.

Accident cause 

The cause of the crash was believed to be pilot error resulting from an optical illusion, created by the lights of the city of Caracas on an upslope. This may have caused the crew to descend until they crashed into the sea, with the loss of all on board. However, the National Transportation Safety Board stated the probable cause was undetermined.

Book about accident
The book The Lost Lives of the Clipper Malay provides details of the aircraft, the accident, and the long process of recovering the bodies of the nine crew members and 42 passengers. The recovery lasted more than a month. The book also provides a biographical account of each of the fifty-one victims.

References 

Airliner accidents and incidents involving controlled flight into terrain
Pan Am accidents and incidents
Accidents and incidents involving the Boeing 707
Aviation accidents and incidents in Venezuela
Aviation accidents and incidents in 1968
1968 in Venezuela
December 1968 events in South America
Pages with unreviewed translations
1968 disasters in Venezuela